The Association des Guides du Cameroun (AGC, Guide Association of Cameroon) is the national Guiding organization of Cameroon. It serves 3,000 members (as of 2003). Founded in 1943, the girls-only organization 

became an associate member of the World Association of Girl Guides and Girl Scouts in 1972 and a full member in 2014.

See also
Les Scouts du Cameroun

References 

World Association of Girl Guides and Girl Scouts member organizations
Scouting and Guiding in Cameroon
Youth organizations established in 1943
1943 establishments in Africa